The Midnight Patrol is a short American pre-Code comedy film starring Laurel and Hardy released August 3, 1933.

Plot
Laurel and Hardy play two policemen on night patrol, hence the title. They are given instructions to investigate a reported break-in but in the process of gathering the details from HQ they stumble upon a would be thief who is attempting to crack the safe of a small store. Laurel mistakes him for the store owner, even going so far as to give assistance in the safe cracking, when Hardy enters to see what is keeping Laurel the boys manage to work out that the thief is not the store owner and rather than arrest him, order him to appear in court at a date to suit the criminal. The boys head back to their car only to find the same thief attempting to steal it, angered Hardy insists that he must 'appear Tuesday' after all (a day the criminal is planning a bank robbery).

On arriving at the alleged crime scene the audience sees that the case is that the owner of the mansion got locked out and so there is no actual robber or robbery at the location. The boys, however, are unaware of this and attempt to break down the front door and eventually manage to succeed with great effort, having causing a great deal of damage to the property they proceed to arrest the owner of the property who they perceive to be the robber.

The boys bring the suspect in to great praise by their colleagues, but the real identity of the 'robber' soon becomes apparent as the other officers recognize him as the Chief of Police. Realizing their error Hardy explains that they are 'new', the Chief seemingly does not accept this excuse and as the boys flee off-screen he opens fire. The other officers then remove their hats indicating that deaths have occurred and the Chief says "send for the coroner".

Cast

Notes
 This is one of only two Laurel & Hardy films where the boys end up deceased.
 The Stoke-on-Trent Laurel & Hardy tent of the Sons of the Desert, the world's biggest Laurel and Hardy fan organization, is named 'The Midnight Patrol Tent' in honour of this film, as well as the San Jose, California tent.
 The two cars featured in the movie are the 1927 Cadillac Standard Line for the police car and 1925 Chevrolet Superior for the street thugs.
 This is one of the very few Laurel and Hardy films to feature an African American character in form of the butler of the Police Chief, portrayed by an uncredited Al Corporal. There were also supposed to be additional scenes where Louise Beavers plays a maid, which were deleted.

References

External links
 
 
 

1933 films
1933 comedy films
American black-and-white films
American comedy short films
Films directed by Lloyd French
Laurel and Hardy (film series)
Metro-Goldwyn-Mayer short films
1930s police comedy films
1930s English-language films
1930s American films